Star Wars: Demolition is a vehicular combat game set in the Star Wars universe created by both Luxoflux and LucasArts using the Vigilante 8 game engine. The premise of the game is that the Galactic Empire declares they have officially banned Jabba the Hutt's podraces, so Jabba creates a more life-threatening vehicular combat contest to replace the sport of podracing. The game was released on both the Sony PlayStation and the Sega Dreamcast; PlayStation on November 12, 2000 and Dreamcast on November 19, 2000.

The game received mixed reviews upon release. Critics felt that while the game was fun in short bursts it lost its appeal with extended gameplay. Subsequent retrospective reviews and major media replays found the game lackluster. Critical commentary pointed to poor controls and boring gameplay.

Gameplay

Star Wars: Demolition is a vehicular combat game set in the Star Wars universe. The objective is to be the last vehicle standing by destroying all other combatants. Several powerups can be found on the battlefield which enhance a player's vehicle. These include weaponry, such as thermal detonators, concussion missiles and proton torpedoes, and boost items, which include additional shielding, cloaking, and increasing the fire rate of weapons. Eight playable stages and 13 combatants are included in the game.

Four game modes are offered to players. In Tournament mode players compete in successively harder rounds at a given location. The first round has one enemy combatant, the second has two, and so on. Here players can unlock new characters by completing the mode with at least 10,000 points. Battle Mode is a free-for-all in which players can practice their skills. High Stakes mode adds a gambling aspect to gameplay. Prior to the round start players are given their odds of winning, a bet is then placed, and the player either receives a payout or has credits deducted based on whether they win or lose. Finally, Hunt-a-Droid mode provides only roaming Imperial probe droids to shoot for target practice and is limited to three minutes. Each mode can be played with one or two players on the PlayStation, while the Dreamcast version supports up to four players.

Setting
The backstory of Star Wars: Demolition is that the Empire declares a ban on Jabba the Hutt's sport of podracing. To replace this lucrative enterprise, Jabba creates a more life-threatening contest where combatants fight to the death in or on vehicles. Several combatants enter the competition. Boba Fett enters, opting to use only his jetpack. Fellow bounty hunter and occasional partner Aurra Sing also enters, a swoop bike her vehicle of choice. Other opponents mount various forms of tanks, landspeeders, and even a rancor to compete in this battle to the death.

Development
Demolition was announced on April 14, 2000 via StarWars.com. It was developed by Luxoflux and published LucasArts. Before its release it was known as Star Wars: Demolition Racer. This would later be shortened to Star Wars: Demolition. Luxoflux used the same game engine that powered both Vigilante 8 and its sequel Vigilante 8: Second Offense. It was initially announced as a PlayStation exclusive, but was rumors circled in July 2000 that the game would come to Dreamcast. This was confirmed the following month. It was released in November 2000 in North America on both systems. A European release followed in December 2000.

Reception

Star Wars: Demolition received "mixed or average reviews" on both platforms according to the review aggregation website Metacritic.

Dan Elektro of GamePro felt that the game's charm runs out quickly, providing little replay value. The reviewer from GameRevolution stated that gameplay is "definitely fun", but that with prolonged play it becomes easier notice the imbalance in gameplay. The game was critically panned in retrospective playthroughs and reviews of the game. Game Informer staff members Andrew Reiner, Jeff Cork, Jeff Marchiafava, and Kyle Hilliard found the game appalling in a replay. During the gameplay one staff member asked "How does it feel?" "Oh, it's awful!" was the reply. The staff felt the battles were too long, gameplay was confusing, and that it was too difficult to damage enemies. It also made Game Informer'''s list of Six Games We Don't Mind Being Ejected From Star Wars Canon.

In a somewhat more positive review IGNs Andrew Chau, who reviewed the Dreamcast version, noted that despite the game's flaws he enjoyed playing Demolition "in small amounts of time." Chau's colleague David Smith, who reviewed the PlayStation version, said that the game was a "very well-done spiritual successor to the first Vigilante 8, though, fixing many of the problems with Second Offense." Joe Fielder of GameSpot said that the game can seem like "some half-baked attempt to cash in on the Star Wars license, though it's actually a competently executed game." Eric Bratcher of NextGen compared the Dreamcast version to the video game adaptation of Star Wars: Episode I – The Phantom Menace'', saying, "All the pieces are there, but they just don't amount to anything."

References

External links
Official website archived via the Wayback Machine
 
 

2000 video games
Activision games
Dreamcast games
PlayStation (console) games
Demolition
Vehicular combat games
LucasArts games
Luxoflux games
Video games developed in the United States